Nammude Naade is a 1990 Indian Malayalam-language film, produced and directed by K. Suku. The film stars Madhu, Jayabharathi, Urvashi and Balan K. Nair. The film has musical score by Vidyadharan.

Cast
Madhu as Krishna Menon
Jayabharathi as Lakshmi, Wife of Krishna Menon
Urvashi as Dr. Bindu
Kuthiravattom Pappu as Driver Musthafa
Balan K. Nair as Maliyekkal Chacko
Lalu Alex as Collector Nandakumar
Paravoor Bharathan as Nandakumar's Father
Vijayaraghavan as Balan
P. K. Abraham as Farm Worker
Prathapachandran as Prabhakara Panikkar
Vincent as SI Gopinath
Jagannatha Varma as DGP
Captain Raju as SP Devarajan IPS
Janardanan as CI Joseph
Sudheer as College Student

Soundtrack
The music was composed by Vidyadharan and the lyrics were written by O. N. V. Kurup.

References

External links
 

1990 films
1990s Malayalam-language films